Graziani is an Italian surname. Notable people with the surname include:

Ariel Graziani (born 1971), South American footballer
Augusto Graziani (1933–2014), Italian economist
Ercole Graziani the Younger  (1688–1765), Italian painter
Francesco Graziani  (1828–1901), Italian baritone
Francesco Graziani (born 1952), Italian footballer
Gaspar Graziani (died 1620), Voivode (Prince) of Moldavia
Girolamo Graziani (1604–1675), Italian poet
Giulio Cesare Graziani (1915–1998), Italian aviator
Ivan Graziani (1945–1997), Italian singer-songwriter
Izhak Graziani (1924–2003), Bulgarian-Born Israeli conductor
Lodovico Graziani (1820–1885), Italian operatic tenor
Luis Arias Graziani (1926–2020), Peruvian air force officer and politician
Rodolfo Graziani (1882–1955), high-ranking Italian military officer and political figure during the 1930s and 1940s
Sergio Graziani (1930-2018), Italian actor and voice actor
Tony Graziani (born 1973), American football player

Italian-language surnames